Cleanfeed may refer to:

Technology
 Cleanfeed (Usenet spam filter), a Usenet spam filter
 Cleanfeed (content blocking system), an Internet blocking system in the United Kingdom and Canada
 Clean feed, or mix-minus a sound reproduction technique
 Clean feed (TV), a television video signal without keys
 Clean feed, a backhaul feed in TV and radio broadcasting

Other
 Clean Feed Records, a Portuguese record label